Univision is an American broadcast television television network owned by Univision Communications, which was launched on September 30, 1962 as the Spanish International Network (SIN). , the network currently has 23 owned-and-operated stations, and current affiliation agreements with 38 other television stations. Univision maintains a national cable network feed that is distributed directly to cable, satellite and IPTV providers in various media markets not listed in this article, as an alternative method of distribution in areas without either the availability or the demand for a locally based owned-and-operated or affiliate station.

This article is a listing of current, pending and former Univision-affiliated stations in the continental United States and U.S. possessions (including subchannel affiliates, satellite stations and select low-power translators), with outlets owned by network parent company Univision Communications separated from privately owned affiliates, and arranged in alphabetical order by city of license and/or Designated Market Area. There are links to and articles on each of the broadcast stations, describing their histories, local programming and technical information, such as broadcast frequencies.

The station's virtual (PSIP) channel number follows the call letters. For the table for the owned-and-operated outlets, the number in parentheses that follows is the station's actual digital channel number; the digital channel number is listed as a separate column in the list of private affiliates. The article also includes a list of its former affiliate stations, which is also based on the station's city of license or market, and denotes the years in which the station served as a Univision affiliate as well as the current status of the corresponding channel that carried the network.

Owned-and-operated stations

 (**) – Indicates a station that was an original Univision-owned station from the network's inception as the Spanish International Network in 1962.
 (++) – Indicates a station that was built and signed on by Univision.
 (¤¤) – Indicates a station that was owned by USA Broadcasting prior to its acquisition by Univision in 2001.

Stations are listed alphabetically by state and city of license.

Univision-affiliated stations

Former affiliates

Notes and references

Station notes

References

Univision